"Where Are You Now" is a song co-written and recorded by American country music artist Clint Black. It was released in July 1991 as the fourth and final single from his album Put Yourself in My Shoes. The song reached number-one on the U.S. Billboard Hot Country Singles & Tracks charts that year, and was his sixth chart-topper. It also reached number-one on the Canadian RPM Country Tracks chart. It was written by Black and Hayden Nicholas.

Chart performance

Year-end charts

References

1991 singles
Clint Black songs
Songs written by Clint Black
Songs written by Hayden Nicholas
Song recordings produced by James Stroud
RCA Records Nashville singles
1990 songs